The IBM System/360 Model 22 was an IBM mainframe from the System/360 line.

History
The Model 22 was a cut-down (economy) version of the Model 30 computer, aimed at bolstering the low end of the range.

The 360/22 was announced less than a year after the June 22, 1970 withdrawal of the 360/30, and it lasted six and a half years, from April 7, 1971, to October 7, 1977.

Comparisons

Models
Only 2 models were offered: 24K or 32K of memory.

Notes

References

System 360 Model 22